The naked characin (Gymnocharacinus bergii) is a small species of fish in the family Characidae. It is the southernmost member of the family (together with some Cheirodon species from Chile) and the only member of the genus Gymnocharacinus. It is endemic to a stream near Valcheta in northern Patagonia, Argentina. Adults have no scales. It is endangered because of habitat loss.

References

Gymnocharacinus
Fish of South America
Fish of Argentina
Fish described in 1903
Taxonomy articles created by Polbot